Xavier High School is an American independent university-preparatory high school for boys run by the USA Northeast Province of the Society of Jesus, in the Chelsea neighborhood of the Manhattan borough of New York City, New York.

Named for St. Francis Xavier (1506–1552), it was founded by John Larkin in 1847 as the College of St. Francis Xavier and also known as St. Francis Xavier College.

History 
The school was founded in 1847 by John Larkin, a professor at St. John's College in Rosehill Manor, then in Westchester County, now a part of the Borough of the Bronx, and which later became Fordham University. It taught boys from the age of eight to twenty-one. The Regents of the University of the State of New York chartered Xavier in 1861.

A military-training unit began at the school in 1886 under the direction of the National Guard, and membership became mandatory in 1892. Five years later, collegiate and secondary studies were separated into different departments, and the college-level department was closed in 1912. The student regiment became a Junior ROTC unit in 1935, and the school was declared a military institute in 1968, offering four years of military science and training which would be recognized upon enrollment in any branch of the United States military. Participation in military studies was declared optional in 1971.

The school has been accredited by the Middle States Association of Colleges and Schools since 1927.

In 2008, Xavier High School announced that then President Daniel James Gatti would be retiring. Gatti's retirement was pushed back until the end of the 2009 school year.  He was succeeded by Hoboken School Superintendent, Jack Raslowsky, the school's 33rd president and the first time in history that the position would be held by a lay person. Upon ascending to the role, Raslowsky oversaw a development operation that leading to a significant physical expansion of the Xavier High School campus.

In March 2021, Xavier High School announced that following a nationwide search, Kim Smith, vice president of Boston College High School, was chosen to take over as headmaster starting July 1. Smith, who would be replacing Headmaster Michael LiVigni, was to become the first female headmaster in the over 170-year history of the school.

Demographics
As of 2021-22, the school had an enrollment of 1,063 students and 95 classroom teachers (on an FTE basis), for a student–teacher ratio of 11:1.

The school’s student body was 70.3% White, 3.9% Black, 12.0% Hispanic, 3.7% Asian, and 10.1% two or more races.

Academics 

The school offers courses under the categories of religion, English, history, modern and classical languages, mathematics, science, fine arts, computer science and technology, military science, health and physical education, and a guidance department program.

Xavier's courses prepare students to embrace the five goals of the Profile of a Graduate of a Jesuit School at Graduation (the "Grad at Grad"). These goals—being open to growth, intellectually competent, religious, loving, and committed to doing justice—are the foundation of Xavier's curriculum and prepare students to live a life of competence, conscience, and compassion.

Athletics 

Xavier, a Catholic High School Athletic Association (CHSAA) member, provides its students the opportunity to pursue a wide variety of sports: baseball, basketball, bowling, cross-country, football, fencing, golf, hockey, indoor/outdoor track and field, rugby, soccer, lacrosse, swimming and diving, tennis, volleyball, and wrestling. Other extracurricular activities include boxing club, choir, speech and debate, chess team, anime, film, science fiction, and skiing /snowboard clubs, school newspaper, The Review, drama productions, UNICEF Club, and the Blue Knight Jazz Band. The Blue Knight Band won best trombone section at the 2010 Villanova University Big Band Festival.

Xavier's current mascot is a knight, and all of its athletic teams are referred to as the Knights. However, for many years, the teams were called the Cadets, a reflection of Xavier's military program, while a terrier was used as a mascot. After a variety of replacements, including the 1980s Bruins, the nickname of the Knights was decided upon in the early 1990s and has been official since.

Football 
The Xavier Football program began in the late 19th century. It has a continued rivalry with the Bronx's Fordham Preparatory School. The two schools compete in an annual "Turkey Bowl", the oldest high school football rivalry in New York City. Their very first game against one another took place in the late 19th century when the game was called off due to darkness, ending in a tie. Many of these football matches were played at Manhattan's famed Polo Grounds, until its demolition.

Rugby 
Rugby is a popular sport at Xavier. Rugby has varsity status, and fields four teams with over 125 players. Xavier has fielded one of the top rugby teams in the United States since the club's founding in 1976.

Track 
The Freshman Track and Field team won the indoor and outdoor 2009 CHSAA Intersectional Championships, the first time in team history. In 2010, the team defended their outdoor victory as sophomores. The Track and Field team competed in the Nationals track meet in Greensboro, North Carolina and finished fifth in both the 4 by 100 and 4 by 200 meter relay, earning Emerging Elite Metals. The team has had much recent success in both cross country and on the track. The cross country team has finished 4th at CHSAA Intersectional Championships in 2011, 5th in 2012, 3rd in 2013, 2nd in 2014, 2nd in 2015 and 1st in 2016, the teams first cross country title in almost a century. The team also won the CHSAA Intersectional Championships in 2017 and 2019. The team finished 2nd at the New York Federation cross country meet by 2 points in 2016. The team repeated with another 2nd place finish at the New York Federation cross country meet in 2017 and finished 7th in 2019. The team has carried the success with an indoor CHSAA Intersectional Championship victory in 2015 and most recently in 2017, the 4X800 meter relay placed 3rd at the National track meet, capturing All American with a 7:50.84. The team captured its second indoor CHSAA Intersectional Championship in 2019.

Swimming 
The Swim Team first moved up to the CHSAA's 'A' Division in the early 1990s. It won the school's first City Championship in 1996 and followed that up by winning the 'A' Division title in 1997. Also in 1996, Xavier won the first 'All-City' Swimming Championship by beating New York City Public School swimming champion Stuyvesant High School. Like many schools in Manhattan, Xavier does not have many athletic resources on-site. As a result, the Xavier Swim Team has used various pools around the city, such as St. Francis College in Brooklyn, the Lower East Side Boys and Girls Club, and Humanities High School. For many years, Xavier had residence at Borough of Manhattan Community College, using their facilities for both practices and dual meets.

Other sports 
In 1859 the College of St. Francis Xavier and St. John's College (now Fordham University) played the first collegiate level baseball game, featuring the new nine-man team style of play. Fordham won the game 33–11.

Xavier High School's JV Soccer team won the CHSAA Intersectional Championship in 2008 and 2009.

Buildings

In 2016, the school acquired space inside a 25-story building, 35 West 15th Street, to house Fernandez-Duminuco Hall, occupying  of space in the basement and six floors. The other floors house condominiums, and both the school campus and the condominiums have separate entrances.

The building has allowed for the expansion of the arts at Xavier. The expansion includes a new band room, music practice rooms, small ensemble room, recording studio, theater, and STEAM classroom, which houses an expanded computer science and technology department, and a student activities space.

Notable people 

Alumni
 Dave Anderson (1929–2018, class of 1947) – The New York Times writer; author
 Vincent M. Battle, (b. 1940, class of 1958) – former United States Ambassador to Lebanon
 John D. Caemmerer (1928–1982, class of 1946) – lawyer; politician who served in the New York Senate
 Jerry Capeci – former organized crime reporter, New York Daily News; writer; and author
 Charles J. Carroll (1882–1942, class of 1905) – lawyer; politician
 John T. Clancy (1903–1985, class of 1921) – lawyer; politician; and surrogate judge from Queens
 Donald Cook (1934-1967, class of 1952) –  colonel, U.S. Marine Corps; recipient, Medal of Honor
 Vincent Cooke – (1936-2017, class of 1954) president, Canisius College (1993–2010)
 John R. Countryman (class of 1950) – United States Ambassador to Oman (1981–1985)
 William H. Crain –  Congressman from Texas
 Brigadier General Ruben Cubero (b. 1939, class of 1957) – first Hispanic dean of the faculty, United States Air Force Academy
 Major General Anthony Cucolo (b. 1957, class of 1975) – 49th commandant, United States Army War College
 John M. Culkin (b. 1932, class of 1950) – media scholar and critic; educator; writer; and consultant
 Albert del Rosario (b. 1939, class of 1957) – Philippine Ambassador to the United States; Philippine Foreign Affairs Secretary
 Hugh Aloysius Drum –  lieutenant-general, United States Army
 George Dzundza (b. 1945, class of 1963) – film and television actor (Law and Order)
 Brad Ferguson (b. 1953, class of 1970) – author; journalist
 Joseph F. Finnegan –  director, Federal Mediation and Conciliation Service
 Douglas Fowley – film and television actor
 Michael Gargiulo (b. 1959, class of 1977) –  Emmy Award-winning television personality (anchor, Today in New York)
 Sonny Grosso – film and television producer
 Ernest E. L. Hammer (1884–1970) – lawyer; politician; and judge
 Jerramiah Healy (b. 1950, class of 1968) – mayor, Jersey City, New Jersey
 George Kaftan (class of 1945) – basketball player, NBA and NCAA; recipient, 1947 MOP award
 Michael Keane (b. 1961, class of 1979) – Nuffield Professor of Economics, University of Oxford
 Seamus Kelly (b. 1991, class of 2009) – outside center, United States national rugby union team
 Robert Kibbee (died 1982) – chancellor, City University of New York
 Thomas A. Ledwith (class of 1856) – lawyer; politician, New York City, New York
 Dudley Field Malone –  defense attorney, Scopes "Monkey" Trial; Collector of Customs, Port of New York (1913); Third Assistant Secretary of State, Woodrow Wilson Administration
 Joseph O. Mauborgne (class of 1901) – major general, U.S. Army; portrait artist; cryptanalyst;  head, Signal Corps
 Frank McGuire (class of 1932) – Hall of Fame basketball coach; taught and coached the basketball team at Xavier for more than a decade
 Charles Messina (b. 1971, class of 1989) – playwright; director
 Michael Montelongo (class of 1973) – 19th Assistant Secretary of the Air Force (Financial Management & Comptroller)
 Neil Olshey (class of 1983) – general manager, Portland Trail Blazers
 Mario Pei (b. 1900, class of 1918) – linguist
 Edmund D. Pellegrino –  former chair, President's Council on Bioethics
 Michael Petri (class of 2002) – United States National Rugby Team
 Eugene A. Philbin –  New York County District Attorney
 John Paul Pitoc (class of 1992) – actor

 Robert J. Reiley (1878–1961) – member, American Institute of Architects; architect of churches, schools, and hospitals in the Northeast
 Al Roker (class of 1972) – NBC television personality; entrepreneur
 Wilbur Ross (class of 1955) – United States Secretary of Commerce; investor known for restructuring failed companies
 Antonin Scalia (1953–2016) – associate justice, United States Supreme Court
 Brian Schulz (class of 1992) – Emmy Award-winning producer and cinematographer for Major League Baseball Productions
 Dermot Shea (class of 1986) – commissioner, New York City Police Department (since 2019)
 Thomas F. Smith (1917–1921) – US Congressman, State of New York
 Stephen Spiro (b. 1939, class of 1957) – Vietnam War opponent; conscientious objector
 Patrick Stokes (b. 1942, class of 1960) – president, Anheuser-Busch
 Steven Strait (class of 2004) – actor; fashion model; and singer
 Augustus Vincent Tack (class of 1890) – painter of portraits, landscapes and abstractions
 Mike Tolkin (class of 1985) – head coach, USA Rugby men's national team
 Lieutenant General John A. Toolan (class of 1972) – commander, Fleet Marine Force Pacific
 Robert Trehy (class of 1939) – opera singer
 Jimmy Walker – mayor, New York City
 Winand Wigger – Catholic prelate
 F. Paul Wilson – author, Repairman Jack science-fiction series

Faculty
 Rev. Francis P. Duffy – former chaplain, 69th Infantry Division (United States) (known as the "Fighting 69th"); teacher of French (1893), "Duffy Square – the northern half of New York City's Times Square between 45th and 47th Streets – is named in his honor".
 Leo Paquin (1910–1993) – 40-year faculty member who was athletic director, football coach, and English and Latin teacher; played end for Fordham University as part of the 1936 line known as the "Seven Blocks of Granite"
 Mike Petri (class 92 2002) – rugby coach; physics and biology teacher 
 Mike Tolkin (class of 1985) – varsity rugby coach; English teacher; left in 2012, after being asked to become the head coach of the USA Rugby team

In popular culture 
Xavier High School has been used in several television shows and movies, including:
 Scenes of The Peacemaker were filmed at Xavier.
 New Kids On The Block filmed the music video for their song "I'll Be Loving You (Forever)" at Xavier.
 Xavier was used as a police precinct for the film Premium Rush.
 A scene from The Winning Season was filmed in the main gymnasium.

See also 
 List of Jesuit sites
 List of Jesuit secondary schools in the United States

References

External links 

 , the school's official website

Educational institutions established in 1847
Boys' schools in New York City
Roman Catholic secondary schools in Manhattan
Jesuit high schools in the United States
Chelsea, Manhattan
1847 establishments in New York (state)
Xavier High School (New York City) alumni